Excuse My French may refer to:

 "Excuse my French" or "Pardon my French", a common English-language phrase intended to excuse the speaker's use of profanity
 Excuse My French (1974 TV series), a Canadian sitcom
 Excuse My French (2006 TV series), a British reality series
 Excuse My French (album), an album by French Montana
 Excuse My French (film), a 2014 Egyptian film

See also 
 Pardon my French (disambiguation)